The Roman Catholic Diocese of Jerez de la Frontera is a diocese of the Latin Church of the Roman Catholic Church. Its name derives from the localities of Medina-Sidonia and Jerez de la Frontera. This bishopric was erected the 3 of March 1980 by means of a Papal Bull, with the name of Asidonense-Jerezano, in memory of the old Asidonense Bishopric and because its present seat is in Jerez de la Frontera. The main temple of this diocese the Colegiata of San Salvador, today Jerez's Cathedral. The Bishopric of the Diocese is in Palace of Bertemati, in the Seat of the Stream. Asidonia-Jerez Seminary was founded in 1985.

Juan Grande Roman has like santo pattern from the diocese and like patron to the Immaculate Conception.

It includes Jerez de la Frontera, Sanlúcar de Barrameda, El Puerto de Santa María, Chipiona, Rota, Trebujena, Arcos de la Frontera, Algar, Bornos, Espera, Villamartín, Prado del Rey, El Bosque, Ubrique, Puerto Serrano, Algodonales, Zahara de la Sierra, Benaocaz, Villaluenga del Rosario, Grazalema, El Gastor, Olvera, Alcalá del Valle, Torre Alháquime and Setenil de las Bodegas.

Deaneries
Arciprestazgo de Jerez
Arciprestazgo de Sanlúcar de Barrameda
Arciprestazgo de El Puerto de Santa María
Arciprestazgo de Arcos de la Frontera
Arciprestazgo de Grazalema
Arciprestazgo de Zahara de la Sierra

History
It is believed the present city of Medina-Sidonia was known in antiquity as Sidonia or Asidonia, a Phoenician colony whose name derives from the name of the city of its founders, Sidón. This bishopric was known as Asidonense.

Bishopric

Bishopric of the old Assidonia
 Maximus (497)
 Manuncio (516)
 Basiliano (593)
 Rufino (628)
 Pimenio (629–649)
 Suetonio (661)
 Paciano (672)
 Fulgencio, monje benedictino 
 Theuderacio (Teoderacio) (681–688)
 Geroncio (690–693)
 Cesario (698)
 Exuperio, obispo mártir por los Musulmanes (713–714)
 Juan, monje  (714)
 Miro (862)
 Pedro (s IX)
 Esteban (950)
 Anonymous (Go to Toledo 1145)
 Sede suppressed (h. 1146–1980)

Bishopric of the Asidonia-Jerez Diocese

1. Rafael Bellido Caro (1980–2000)
2. Juan del Río Martín (2000–2008), appointed Archbishop of Spain, Military
3. José Mazuelos Pérez (2009–2020), appointed Bishop of Canarias
4. José Rico Pavés (2021–present)

Also Sees 
 Bishopric Asidonia-Jerez Diocese
 Asidonia-Jerez Seminary Catholic

Jerez de la Frontera
Jerez de la Frontera
Roman Catholic dioceses and prelatures established in the 20th century
Jerez de la Frontera